The 6th Pan American Junior Athletics Championships were held in Kingston, Jamaica, on July 18–20, 1991.

Participation (unofficial)

Detailed result lists can be found on the "World Junior Athletics History" website.  An unofficial count yields the number of about 347 athletes from about 26 countries:  Argentina (5), Bahamas (1), Barbados (4), Bermuda (3), Brazil (10), British Virgin Islands (2), Canada (65), Chile (6), Cuba (41), Dominica (1), Ecuador (8), Grenada (4), Guatemala (7), Guyana (1), Jamaica (49), Mexico (46), Netherlands Antilles (2), Panama (9), Paraguay (1), Peru (4), Puerto Rico (5), Saint Vincent and the Grenadines (2), Trinidad and Tobago (5), Turks and Caicos Islands (5), United States (47), Venezuela (14).

Medal summary
Medal winners are published.
Complete results can be found on the "World Junior Athletics History"
website.

Men

Women

Medal table (unofficial)

References

External links
World Junior Athletics History

Pan American U20 Athletics Championships
1991 in Jamaican sport
Pan American U20 Championships
International athletics competitions hosted by Jamaica
1991 in youth sport